Mary M. Glackin is an American scientist. She is the 2020 President of the American Meteorological Society (AMS).

Career 
Glackin was previously Senior Vice President for Science and Forecast Operations at The Weather Company, an IBM Business. She retired from the National Oceanic and Atmospheric Administration in 2012 as the Deputy Under Secretary for Operations, after working in various roles in the organization for 34 years, including in the National Weather Service and the US Global Change Research Program.

Education 
Glackin has a B.S. from the University of Maryland (1984) with a major in computer science with concentration in atmospheric science.

Awards 
Glackin is a Fellow of AMS and a recipient of the Charles Franklin Brooks Award for Outstanding Service to the Society (2004). She has twice received the U.S. Presidential Rank Award and the Department of Commerce Silver and Bronze Medals. She is a fellow National Academy of Public Administration.

References 

21st-century American scientists
American computer scientists
American women computer scientists
Year of birth missing (living people)
Living people
Fellows of the United States National Academy of Public Administration
21st-century American women scientists